Kofi is a crater on Mercury. Its name was adopted by the International Astronomical Union (IAU) on April 24, 2012. Kofi is named for the Ghanaian sculptor Vincent Kofi.

Kofi is one of 110 peak ring basins on Mercury.  Most of the peak ring has been covered by lava.

A number of dark spots are present to the east and northeast of Kofi crater.  The dark spots are associated with hollows.

References

Impact craters on Mercury